Chuck Adamson (born August 20, 1938) is a Canadian former professional ice hockey goaltender.

Career 
Adamson played seven seasons in the International Hockey League (IHL). He won the James Norris Memorial Trophy while playing with the Fort Wayne Komets during the 1964–65 IHL season.

Awards and honors

References

External links

1938 births
Living people
Canadian ice hockey goaltenders
Des Moines Oak Leafs players
Fort Wayne Komets players
Ice hockey people from Ontario
Sportspeople from Greater Sudbury
Indianapolis Chiefs players
Jersey Larks players
Milwaukee Falcons players
Peterborough Petes (ice hockey) players